Alando Soakai (born 11 May 1983 in West Auckland) is a former professional rugby union player from New Zealand best known for his time with the Highlanders in Super Rugby and Otago in the ITM Cup, and as captain of Otago in their 2009 and 2010 campaigns. He currently serves on the coaching staff of the Kubota Spears in the Japan Rugby League One, the club where he finished his playing career.

Coaching career

Japan

Soakai closed out his career with the Tokyo-based Kubota Spears in 2015-16 season as a player-coach. Following his retirement, Soakai transition into full time coaching. 2022 Soakai went onto coach the Japan National Development Squad which successfully beat Uruguay in a test match.

Playing career

Provincial Rugby

Soakai was educated at Auckland Grammar School. Soakai shifted south to Dunedin in 2002 to attend the University of Otago, eventually signing to play provincial rugby for Otago.

After spending the 2004 season on loan with Southland, Soakai made his debut for Otago in 2005 and by the 2006 Air New Zealand Cup was a regular starter for the squad. In ensuing seasons, he developed into one of Otago's most reliable players, and was selected team captain for the 2009 Air New Zealand Cup.

In the 2010 ITM Cup, Soakai made his 50th appearance for Otago and set a personal best with 3 tries over the course of the season, but endured a difficult season as captain as the team had a disastrous year to finish dead last in the competition.

He played over fifty games in club rugby for Kaikorai Demons in the local Dunedin competition.

Super Rugby

Soakai was selected to the Highlanders squad for the 2007 Super 14 season, and appeared in all but one game for the team including 7 starts. After a mass exodus from the club following the 2007 Rugby World Cup, Soakai solidified his spot as the team's starting openside flanker in 2008.

Soakai continued to be a fixture for the Highlanders through the 2009 and 2010 Super 14 seasons, starting 12 out of the 13 matches in both years.

Following the 2011 season, Soakai left New Zealand to sign in Japan with the Kubota Spears.

International Play

Soakai is an accomplished rugby sevens New Zealand Sevens player, and has represented New Zealand and won a Commonwealth Games gold medal in Melbourne in 2006 and an IRB World Sevens Series title in 2007.

A strong 2009 Super Rugby season, Soakai was selected to the Junior All Blacks for the 2009 IRB Pacific Nations Cup. He appeared in all 4 games in the tournament, including a start against Japan, as the squad swept their way to victory.

2010, Soakai earn the opportunity to captain the New Zealand Barbarians against the New Zealand Maori, marking 100 years of Maori Rugby.

Having played for the Junior All Blacks and the New Zealand Sevens team, Soakai was ineligible to take advantage of his ancestry to play for Tonga.

References

External links 
 
 

1983 births
Commonwealth Games gold medallists for New Zealand
People educated at Auckland Grammar School
Highlanders (rugby union) players
Southland rugby union players
Otago rugby union players
Kubota Spears Funabashi Tokyo Bay players
Living people
New Zealand rugby union coaches
New Zealand rugby union players
New Zealand sportspeople of Tongan descent
Rugby sevens players at the 2006 Commonwealth Games
New Zealand expatriate rugby union players
Expatriate rugby union players in Japan
New Zealand expatriate sportspeople in Japan
Rugby union players from Auckland
New Zealand international rugby sevens players
Commonwealth Games rugby sevens players of New Zealand
Commonwealth Games medallists in rugby sevens
Rugby union flankers
Medallists at the 2006 Commonwealth Games